The Wernhil Shopping Centre formerly known as Wernhil Park Mall is a mall in Windhoek central business district. It is named after the first names of Werner and Hildegard List, the then-senior stockholders of the Ohlthaver & List group of companies who owns the facility. It is the second largest mall in Namibia. In 2011, Wernhil reopened after a N$ 600 million expansion.

External links
Official website

References

Buildings and structures in Windhoek
Shopping malls established in 1990
Shopping malls in Namibia
1990 establishments in Namibia